Lauro Rossi (born in Macerata, 19 February 1810; died in Cremona, 5 May 1885), was an Italian composer, particularly of operas. There is no known connection with Luigi Rossi (1597–1653).

Life and career
Rossi studied in Naples and produced his first opera there. His greatest success was with the comic opera originally entitled La casa disabitata, which was performed for many years in its revised form under the title I falsi monetari.

However, Rossi suffered a fiasco in 1835, after which he left Naples for Mexico, then Cuba. There he set up his own opera company, and married its prima donna, Isabella Obermayer. He returned to Italy in 1843 and continued composing, but, thereafter, he was mainly known as an academic figure as director of the Conservatory, first at Milan (1850–1870) and then at Naples (1870–1878). He was commissioned by Giuseppe Verdi to compose a portion of the Messa per Rossini; specifically, Number V. Agnus Dei, for solo Alto.

Two of his late operas were also highly successful: La Contessa di Mons and Cleopatra.

Operas 
 Le contesse villane (1829, revised as La villana contessa and also as Le principesse villane, 1830)
 Costanza e Oringaldo (1830, in collaboration with P. Raimondi)
 La sposa al lotto (1831)
 La casa in vendita, ovvero II casino di campagna (1831)
 La scommessa di matrimonio (1831)
 Baldovino, tiranno di Spoleto (1832)
 II maestro di scuola (1832)
 II disertore svizzero, ovvero La nostalgia (1832)
 Le fucine di Bergen (1833)
 La casa disabitata, ovvero Don Eustachio di campagna (1834, revised as I falsi monetari, 1844 and possibly also as Don Eutichio e Sinforosa)
 Amelia, ovvero Otto anni di costanza (1834)
 Leocadia (1835)
 Giovanna Shore (1836)
 II borgomastro di Schiedam (1844)
 Dottor Bobolo, ovvero La fiera (1845)
 Cellini a Parigi (1845)
 Azema di Granata, ovvero Gli Abencerragi ed i Zegrini (1846) (libretto by Jacopo Ferretti)
 La figlia di Figaro (1846)
 Blanca Contarini (1847)
 Il domino nero (1849) revived in Italy, and available on CD
 Le Sabine (1852)
 L'alchimista (1853)
 La sirena (1855)
 Lo zingaro rivale (1867)
 Il maestro e la cantante (1867)
 Gli artisti alla fiera (1868)
 La contessa di Mons (1874)
 Cleopatra (1876) revived in 2008
 Biorn (1877)

Bibliography 
 Holden, Amanda (with Nicholas Kenyon and Stephen Walsh),The Viking Opera Guide, New York: Viking, 1993

References

External links 
 
 

1810 births
1885 deaths
Italian classical composers
Italian male classical composers
Italian Romantic composers
Italian opera composers
Male opera composers
People from Macerata
Academic staff of Milan Conservatory
19th-century classical composers
19th-century Italian male musicians